Drom Soccer Park is an association football venue in the Republic of Ireland based in Drom East, Rahoon, County Galway. It is the home ground of Salthill Devon F.C. It was built in 2002 and has a capacity of 2,000. Drom also hosts the Galway Cup annually.

References

Association football venues in the Republic of Ireland
Salthill Devon F.C.
Sports venues in County Galway
2002 establishments in Ireland